Pul-e-Charkhi Prison (Pashto/Dari: زندان پل چرخی), also known as the Afghan National Detention Facility, is a maximum security prison located next to the Ahmad Shah Baba Mina neighborhood in the eastern part of Kabul, Afghanistan. It has the capacity to house between 5,000 and 14,000 inmates, but as of February 2023 it only has between 2,000 and 2,500 inmates, most of whom have been arrested and convicted within the jurisdiction of Kabul Province. It is considered the country's largest prison.

History
Construction of Pul-e-Charkhi Prison began in the 1970s by order of former president Mohammed Daoud Khan and was completed during the 1980s. It became notorious for torture and executions after the 1978 Saur Revolution as well as during the 10 year Soviet war that followed. Some claim that between April 1978 and December 1979, the communist People's Democratic Party of Afghanistan (PDPA) under Nur Muhammad Taraki, executed around 27,000 political prisoners at Pul-i-Charkhi. More recently, the Afghan National Army's 111th Capital Division was based near Pul-e-Charkhi prison.

Mass grave

In December 2006, a communist-era mass grave, close to the Puli Charkhi prison, was discovered by the NATO-led International Security Assistance Force (ISAF). It is believed that the grave held some 2,000 bodies. Officials of the Afghan Ministry of Information and Culture believe that the massacre took place between 1978 and 1986 when the Moscow-backed communist presidents, Nur Muhammad Taraki, Hafizullah Amin and Babrak Karmal were in power.

Living conditions
Living conditions of the prisoners have been criticized by several human rights groups. The prison had been cited as overcrowded and the living conditions as sub-par. There had been eight cell blocks but only three were being used which has caused overcrowding. There are also about 70 female prisoners who are housed in a special female section of the prison.

Riots and escapes
In December 2004, foreign prisoners attacked guards with razor blades. A subsequent shoot-out left one Iraqi, three Pakistani prisoners and four Afghan police dead.

In January 2006, seven prisoners escaped by mingling with visitors. A month later, a riot was sparked by a new prison policy forcing prisoners to wear bright orange clothing, a rule enacted to avoid events similar to the January escape. The February 2006 riot resulted in six deaths and 22 injured according to the International Committee of the Red Cross. The rioters used makeshift weapons to attack guards, then ignited furniture on fire, and smashed doors and windows. They eventually took over a wing of the prison and held it for a few days. The riot finally ended on the first of March.

On 16 March 2008, after a two-week dispute over arrests following an attempted jail-break, inmates rioted and took over sections of the building. Gunfire was heard in the complex and inmates claimed to be holding hostage two members of the Afghan National Army (ANA). The hostage-takers threatened to kill the ANA members unless mediators were sent in to resolve the conflict.

Renovation and expansion

The prison has been renovated in recent years with assistance from the United States, including the United States Army Corps of Engineers. In 2007, the U.S. military began transferring some of its detainees from Bagram Air Base in Afghanistan to the Pul-e-Charkhi prison. By January 2008, as many as 125 detainees from the Parwan Detention Facility and 32 detainees from the U.S. Guantanamo Bay detention camp had been transferred to Pul-e-Charkhi. This was followed by the transfer of some 250 more detainees.

The United States repeatedly announced that it will be shutting down its Guantanamo Bay detention camps, in Cuba. The Americans planned to transfer most of the captives held in extrajudicial detention in Guantanamo, and in its less well known Parwan Detention Facility to Afghan custody.

The initial plan called for reducing the maximum number of men held per cell from the current eight, to just two. For security reasons every cell would be equipped with its own toilet, replacing the current insecure method of letting all the captives leave their cells and share a single toilet at the end of each cell-block.

Under this initial plan, the modernization of this wing cost $20 million, and would have a maximum capacity of 670 captives. However, after a tour of the facility, during its modernization, it was realized that, for cultural reasons, captives could not be expected to share a toilet with another man. Afghan cultural modesty would not allow a captive to use a toilet with another man present, cutting the capacity of the modernized facility in half.

On May 6, 2007, two American soldiers, Colonel James W. Harrison Jr. and Master Sergeant Wilberto Sabalu, part of the oversight team, were shot dead by one of the Afghan guards. This forced a delay on construction as all the guards underwent new security checks. Finally, there was controversy within the Afghan government as to which ministry would be responsible for the modernized part of the prison.

By January 2008, 32 captives from the Guantanamo Bay detention camp and 125 captives from the Parwan Detention Facility had been transferred to Pul-e-Charkhi. The Center for Constitutional Rights reported that all of the Afghans repatriated to Afghanistan from April 2007 were sent to the Pul-e-Charkhi prison.

In February 2009, a team from the United Kingdom's Channel 4 toured the American wing of the prison. By September 2009 the United States had transferred some 250 former detainees from its Guantanamo Bay detention camp to Pul-e-Charkhi, often to the shock of their waiting families, according to Human Rights First (HRF).

2021
On August 15, 2021, management of the prison was handed over to forces of the Islamic Emirate of Afghanistan after the fall of President Ashraf Ghani's government. The Taliban released most inmates from the jail, including many of their fellow members.

See also 
 List of prisons in Afghanistan

References

External links 

 , March 10, 2017, TOLOnews.
 , May 16, 2011, CBC News: The National.
 , Jan. 24, 2009, Al Jazeera.
 Human Rights First; Undue Process: An Examination of Detention and Trials of Bagram Detainees in Afghanistan in April 2009 (2009)
 Human Rights First; Arbitrary Justice: Trial of Guantánamo and Bagram Detainees in Afghanistan (2008)
 Lyse Doucet's (BBC Newsnight, Afghanistan) full film from inside Pul-e-Charkhi prison

Prisons in Afghanistan
1980s establishments in Afghanistan
Afghanistan–Soviet Union relations